Sclareol cyclase (geranylgeranyl pyrophosphate:sclareol cyclase, geranylgeranyl pyrophosphate-sclareol cyclase, GGPP:sclareol cyclase) is an enzyme with systematic name geranylgeranyl-diphosphate diphosphohydrolase (sclareol-forming). This enzyme catalyses the following chemical reaction

 geranylgeranyl diphosphate + 2 H2O  sclareol + diphosphate

This enzyme requires Mg2+ or Mn2+ for activity.

References

External links 
 

EC 3.1.7